Müglitz may refer to:

Müglitz, the German name for Mohelnice, a town in the eastern Czech Republic
Böhmisch Müglitz, the German name for Mohelnice, a former village in the northwestern Czech Republic
Müglitz (Altenberg), a village in the municipality Altenberg, Saxony, Germany
Müglitz (river), a river in Saxony, Germany